When Love Is King is a 1916 silent film comedy drama, that was produced and distributed by Thomas A. Edison, Inc. in conjunction with George Kleine. The film is a starring debut for stage actress Carroll McComas.

The film is preserved at the Library of Congress.

Cast
Richard Tucker - Felix, the King
Carroll McComas - Marcia Morton
Bigelow Cooper - J.P. Morton
Vivian Perry - The Princess Louise
John Sturgeon - The Prince of Trebizond
Harold Meltzer - Baron Tarnow
Carlton S. King - Stepan (as Carlton King)
T. Tamamoto - Janzi
Robert Brower - The Prime Minister
Charles Sutton - The Ambassador
Guido Colucci - The Viscount
Helen Strickland - Mrs. Morton
Lucille Allen - The Countess Irma
James Harris

References

External links
 
AllMovie.com

1916 films
American silent feature films
1916 comedy-drama films
American black-and-white films
1910s American films
1910s English-language films
Silent American comedy-drama films